People's Front is a political organization in the Republic of Georgia. This party was founded in 1989, in Tbilisi. Chairman of the organization is a noted Georgian scholar, Professor Nodar Natadze.
1989 establishments in Georgia (country)
National liberation movements
Political parties in Georgia (country)
Pro-independence parties in the Soviet Union